Hypothenemus eruditus is a species of typical bark beetle in the family Curculionidae. It is found in North America, temperate Asia, and Europe.

References

Further reading

 
 

Scolytinae
Articles created by Qbugbot
Beetles described in 1836